Longrita is a genus of spiders in the family Trachycosmidae. It was first described in 2002 by Platnick. , it contains 10 Australian species.

Species
Longrita comprises the following species:
Longrita arcoona Platnick, 2002
Longrita findal Platnick, 2002
Longrita grasspatch Platnick, 2002
Longrita insidiosa (Simon, 1908)
Longrita millewa Platnick, 2002
Longrita nathan Platnick, 2002
Longrita rastellata Platnick, 2002
Longrita whaleback Platnick, 2002
Longrita yuinmery Platnick, 2002
Longrita zuytdorp Platnick, 2002

References

Trochanteriidae
Araneomorphae genera
Spiders of Australia